Hans Willems (born 22 March 1934) is a retired sailor from the Netherlands. He competed in the Finn class at the 1964 Summer Olympics and finished in 16th place.

Sources

 
 
 
 

Living people
1934 births
Sportspeople from Amsterdam
Dutch male sailors (sport)
Sailors at the 1964 Summer Olympics – Finn
Olympic sailors of the Netherlands